In mathematics, the dual bundle is an operation on vector bundles extending the operation of duality for vector spaces.

Definition

Constructions and examples

The dual bundle  is then constructed using the fiber bundle construction theorem. As particular cases:

 The dual bundle of an associated bundle is the bundle associated to the dual representation of the structure group.
 The dual bundle of the tangent bundle of a differentiable manifold is its cotangent bundle.

Properties

If the base space  is paracompact and Hausdorff then a real, finite-rank vector bundle  and its dual  are isomorphic as vector bundles. However, just as for vector spaces, there is no natural choice of isomorphism unless  is equipped with an inner product.

This is not true in the case of complex vector bundles: for example, the tautological line bundle over the Riemann sphere is not isomorphic to its dual. The dual  of a complex vector bundle  is indeed isomorphic to the conjugate bundle  but the choice of isomorphism is non-canonical unless  is equipped with a hermitian product.

The Hom bundle  of two vector bundles is canonically isomorphic to the tensor product bundle 

Given a morphism  of vector bundles over the same space, there is a morphism  between their dual bundles (in the converse order), defined fibrewise as the transpose of each linear map  Accordingly, the dual bundle operation defines a contravariant functor from the category of vector bundles and their morphisms to itself.

References

 

Vector bundles
Geometry